Timbiriche (also known for a brief time as La Banda Timbiriche) is a Mexican pop music group. The group started as a children's group in 1981 and managed to evolve successfully into adulthood.

Timbiriche is considered one of the most iconic Latin Pop acts of the 1980s and the early 1990s. It was the start of numerous figures in the Latin American entertainment world, including successful singers like Thalía, Paulina Rubio and Edith Márquez, as well as actors, composers and conductors.

The discography of the band consists of twelve studio albums released between 1982 and 1993, in addition to two compilation albums and two discs recorded live. Timbiriche is considered one of the most popular Latin Pop bands of all time. They have met in three successful reunions. The first occurred in 1998, the second in 2007 celebrating 25 years since the foundation of the band and the third one in 2017, celebrated by a sold out tour.

The band have also starred in a documentary directed by Carlos Marcovich entitled La Misma Piedra that followed step by step the band's adventures in the preparation of the tours, concerts and behind the scenes of its 25th anniversary. In 2007, Televisa also produced a reality show whose objective was to integrate a new lineup for the band.

History

Name
Timbiriche (known in the United States as Dots and Boxes), is a Paper-and-pencil game of mathematical structure. The objective of the game is to complete squares using points, and thus claim as many of these as possible on paper.
The idea of naming the musical group comes in response to the Spanish children's musical group Parchís, whose name is also inspired by a table game.

Origin
The idea of forming the musical group goes back to the founding of the children's area of the Centro de Educación Artística (CEA) of the Mexican television network Televisa. The responsibility of recruiting a group of children for the ranks of the school was in charge of the Mexican actress and producer Martha Zavaleta. The children chosen to join the institution were Mariana Garza, Alix Bauer, Paulina Rubio and Diego Schoening. They were eventually joined by Benny Ibarra and Sasha Sokol. The group of children were trained in singing, dancing and acting in the institution. Eventually they staged a play. It was thanks to this work that the executives of Televisa had the idea of forming a children's musical group with the six children.
At that time, the Spanish musical group Parchís caused a sensation in Mexico and several countries of Spanish Speaking. Televisa formed Timbiriche as a Mexican response to Parchís. The creative team in charge of launching this group was formed by Victor Hugo O'Farril, former partner, producer and creative of the television station and producer Luis de Llano Macedo. María Eugenia La Gorda Galindo, was selected as manager of the group.

Children's Band (1982-1984)
After a few months of preparation, Timbiriche made its official debut on 30 April 1982 on the Mexican television show Siempre en Domingo, featuring Spanish singer Miguel Bosé as its godfather. The group launches their first record production titled Timbiriche, which included the hit singles Amor para tí, Hoy tengo que decirte Papá, Y la fiesta comenzó and Somos amigos.

Due to the success obtained, and in order to have a wider repertoire in their presentations, the group recorded a second album titled La Banda Timbiriche, which included the hit singles La Banda Timbiriche, La vida es mejor cantando, México and Mamá . The group is also chosen to interpret the musical theme of the children's telenovela Chispita. In that same year, the group participates in a special of television where it shares scene with the group Parchís.

In 1983, the group released the album La Banda Timbiriche: En Concierto an album that was released under the concept of being a live album, although in fact the sound effects of the public were added in the recording studio. The album includes covers of songs in English and of musicals famous at that time like Time Warp of The Rocky Horror Picture Show, One Step (cover of Liza Minnelli and Goldie Hawn' song), Summer Nights (from the musical Grease) and Mickey (cover by Toni Basil). In this third album, the group already enjoyed a great acceptance in Mexico, receiving several disks of gold by the high sales of its albums.

At that moment of the group, the voices of the only two male members of the group were confused with those of the female members due to their young age. Because of this, the producers considered the idea of integrating a third male member into the group. The chosen one was Erik Rubín, who joins the band in December 1983. The band launches its fourth disc, titled Timbiriche Disco Ruido. The album was the first big challenge of the band, because it was not known what the public reaction would be to the new member, who had to go through many conflicts to adapt with his peers. However, the album had a good reception and contained hits such as Disco ruido and Adiós a la escuela.

Teen Band (1985-1987)
In 1984, Timbiriche, along with several other children actors and singers, starred in a version of the play Grease (called Vaselina in Mexico). The play was produced by the actress and producer Julissa. From this staging comes the album Timbiriche Vaselina, which was another success of the grouping. The album released the hit singles Amor primero (Those Magic Changes), Rayo Rebelde (Grease Lightnin'), Freddy mi amor (Freddy My love) and Iremos juntos (We Go Together).

For 1985, the group begins an evolution. They were no longer a children's group, and this situation leads to a new, fresher sound aimed at teenagers. This change is evident in the record Timbiriche Rock Show, released in 1985.

But in the middle of the success, Benny decides to leave the group in September of that same year, after the recording of the album and after to have participated only in the promotion of the first two singles. His reason was that he wanted to prepare in music by enrolling in a school in the United States. The chosen one to replace it was Eduardo Capetillo, that already had been made known before for his stellar roll in the play Grease. Eduardo is the one who performs the rest of the album promotion. From this production stand out songs like Teléfono (cover of Sheena Easton's song Telefone (Long Distance Love Affair)), Juntos, Soy un desastre, Corro, vuelo, me acelero, Me planto y Mi globo azul (cover of Nena' s song 99 Luftballons).

In August 1986 Sasha, another founding member, announced her departure from the group in order to become independent and launch herself as a solo singer. A month later, her place is occupied by Thalía, who had been announced a few years ago in a children's musical group called Din-Din, and also served as a substitute for Sasha in the Grease play.<ref>[https://www.helloforos.com/t/thalia-din-din-y-moderna-nina-del-rock/58940 Helloforos.com: Thalía, Din-Din and Moderna niña del rock]</ref>

In 1987, Timbiriche released the album Timbiriche VII. With this album, the group obtains a success superior to the one of the previous disc, consolidating like one of the youthful groups leaders of Latin America and Spain. The album included hits like No seas tan cruel, Besos de ceniza, Mírame (Cuestión de tiempo), Si no es ahora, Con todos menos conmigo, Rompecabezas, Mágico amor and Ya estaba escrito.

In that same year, Timbiriche interprets the main theme of the telenovela Quinceañera, that was carried out by Thalía and the actress Adela Noriega.

In December of that same year, the group is invited to participate in the Christmas album Esta navidad, next to another artists. Timbiriche interprets the song ¡Ay del Chiquirritín!. In that same month, Mariana Garza, another of the founding members of the group, announces her departure from the group to enter as a television actress. It is Mariana herself who chooses for her replacement Edith Márquez, another young girl who was also part of Greases cast. In addition, Edith already was well-known for her participation in the TV sitcom Papá soltero. Edith lived a difficult process of adaptation when arriving at the group.

Adult Band (1988-1991)
The double album Timbiriche VIII & IX was released on 7 May 1988. The record was produced as a double album, as producers did not decide to choose the repertoire of songs that would include in the new album. At the time, the double discs were a novelty in Latin America and few artists were encouraged to produce them. The album (which was also released for sale separately) included the hit singles Tú y yo somos uno mismo, Ámame hasta con los dientes, Acelerar, Yo no se si es amor, Me estoy volviendo loca, Junto a tí, Máscaras, Pasos and Tú me vuelves loco. This period is considered as the zenith in the trajectory of the group and gives another step in its evolution, positioning itself as a young adult band.

In November 1988, Alix, another of the founders, decides to leave the group to prepare her solo career. After a series of auditions, in February 1989 her place is occupied by Bibi Gaytán, who ends next to the rest of the members the tour corresponding to the double album.

In February 1989 goes out for sale the first compilation album of the group titled Los Clásicos de Timbiriche. The album contains a compilation of the group's greatest hits, accompanied by the Symphony Orchestra of Mexico City, and was recorded in the Sala Netzahualcoyotl of Mexico City. The disc included an unpublished song, titled Por tí, and counted with the participation of Benny, Sasha and Mariana, the former members of the group. The production was recorded at the end of 1988, when Alix was still part of the group, but was released on sale until February 1989. That's why Bibi was not included in the album.

In August 1989 Eduardo Capetillo and Thalía also opt to leave the group to prepare their solo careers. After new auditions, their places are occupied by Claudio Bermúdez and Patty Tanús respectively.

The album Timbiriche X is considered by many as the last album that retains the original style of the band that, at the moment, already had only three of the original members: Paulina, Diego and Erik, besides Edith and Bibi, who were joined by Claudio and Patty. However, after only a few months, Patty is expelled from the group for having lied to producers regarding her age and marital status, being replaced by Silvia Campos, who although she did not record the album, if she toured and promoted it . The disc contained a strong influence of the dance music, that at that moment enjoyed enormous popularity in the dance floors of the world. The album included the successful singles Princesa Tibetana, Me pongo mal, Historia de amor, Yo no soy una más, Sacudete and Como te diré. With this record, Timbiriche receives his first Eres Award as Best Pop Group. In 1991, the group celebrates its 10th anniversary.

But at the end of the tour, Paulina, another of the founding members, leaves the group to open a career as a soloist. Just two weeks later, Erik, Edith and Bibi also announce their departure from the group to pursue a career as soloists. This situation leaves Diego as the only original member of the band, in addition to Claudio and Silvia.

The Second Generation (1991-1994)

Without the majority of its original members, the group was in decline, but the producers decided to continue with the concept and bet on launching a new generation. Surprisingly, in the midst of production, Claudio is fired from the group.

By the end of 1991, the band returns with five new members: Lorena Shelley, Daniel Gaytan, Tannya Velasco, Kenya Hijuelos and Alexa Lozano. Together with Diego and Silvia they record the album Timbiriche XI. Kenya leaves the group before the official presentation of the disc by decision of the creators of the group by conflicts between the new members, being replaced by Jean Duverger. This second generation is officially presented during a broadcast of Siempre en domingo, in which all former members were invited to introduce the new members. This meeting was unique, since it had almost all the members of the group, being the only ones missing Diego, due to health problems and Thalía, who was working in Spain.

Despite retaining the name and concept in general, there was a new musical style that mixed dance and tropical rhythms. Although the album was not so popular with fans of the first generation, it began to appeal to younger generations, thanks to hits like Vanidosa, Sólo te quiero a tí, Tierra dorada, and Piel a piel, receiving disc of Gold and platinum by high sales. Thanks to this the group could survive another year.

For 1993 they record Timbiriche XII, disc of which it was detached like the last success of the group: Muriendo Lento (cover of Slowly original song of the ex- singer of the Swedish group ABBA, Anni-Frid Lyngstad). But at the beginning of 1994 Alexa decided to leave the group, announcing it in a concert in Monterrey to the fans without having said before to the managers and companions. This was one of the reasons that led to the final disintegration.

First Reunion (1998-1999)
In 1998, in the frame of the Festival Acapulco '98, the original six members reunited in the scene in a historical night that broke record of hearing. After the success obtained, it reissues the disc Los Clásicos de Timbiriche, now with the name of Timbiriche Symphonic that generated great stir among the followers.

Plans for a formal reunion crystallized in late November 1998, when the group performed a concert at the Auditorio Nacional of Mexico City. This concert also included Erik Rubín. For 1999, the group initiated a tour that was developed by all Mexico and part of Latin America. The reunion established in the Auditorio Nacional a record of hearing with more than 20 consecutive concerts. The tour would conclude with a massive concert at Foro Sol, also in Mexico City.

From that tour a double album titled Timbiriche, El concierto, was recorded that was recorded live in the Auditorio Nacional on 20 December 1998. This album also included three new songs: Esta Despierto, Suma Cósmica and La Fuerza del Amor.

25th Anniversary Reunion (2007-2008)
The original members of the group (including Erik, and with the exception of Paulina Rubio, who can not participate for personal commitments), reunited in 2007 to celebrate the 25th anniversary of the band (30 April 2007). The celebration took place through a tour of concerts and three albums: one before the concerts, titled Timbiriche 25, with new versions of 12 classic songs of the group, a live album with some songs of the concert titled Somos Timbiriche 25 and finally the live album Timbiriche Vivo en Vivo (cd double + DVD) with the full version of the concert. The album also includes three unpublished songs: Vuelvo a Comenzar, Atado a tí and Domar el Aire. These themes are a gift and thanks to the fans who helped make Timbiriche's 25th anniversary a great success.

Timbiriche broke its record in the Auditorio Nacional with more than 20 consecutive performances with full masses and more than 30 concerts throughout Mexico. On Monday, 5 May 2008 Timbiriche closed the celebration of its 25 years at Foro Sol.

On 17 May 2008, the group participated at the Mexico City ALAS concert, benefitting poor children in Latin America. The group performed alongside singers like Miguel Bosé, Ricky Martin, Maná, and Chayanne, among others.

In addition, film director Carlos Marcovich who accompanied the group for much of the tour, announced the production of a documentary feature on Timbiriche, which was called La misma Piedra and premiered on Friday, 21 November 2008 in all Mexico cinemas.

The Reality Show
To celebrate the group's 25th anniversary, Televisa launched a great call for the formation of a new Band Timbiriche, this time formed by seven young people between 15-22 years old. The process was carried out through a reality show called Buscando a Timbiriche, La Nueva Banda. It was attended by 30 young people, and was endorsed by some of the original creators of the concept and other personalities of the show (Luis de Llano, Memo Méndez Guiú, Marco Flavio Cruz, Marta Zavaleta, Amparo Rubin and Kiko Campos). The six members of the project Timbiriche 25 (Diego, Erick, Sasha, Alix, Mariana and Benny) who participated as a jury evaluating the performance of the candidates. The band would be called The New Timbiriche Band.

Brissia, Fernanda, Gabriela, Taide, Alberto, Eduardo and Yurem, were chosen to form this new group. But the concept did not have the expected success. Only the single Tú, tú, tú achieve some acceptance of the public. The group disbanded in April 2009.

The Musical
In October 2007, producer Pedro Damián announced that he was planning to make a feature film based on Timbiriche's songs.

The script was written by Martha Carrillo and Cristina García (who wrote the script for the telenovela Tres Mujeres) which tells the story of adolescent love through the music of Sasha, Benny, Diego, Mariana, Álix, Érick, and Paulina.

About the project, Damián said, "It's like the play Hoy No Me Puedo Levantar'' (with music from Mecano) or like the Abba play Mamma Mia! — plays that used the music from the groups with different stories."

Carrillo told a Mexican newspaper that the plot deals with "the life of some kids who are trying to move forward with music, but not as a band; the main character is a composer, but she's not the one who sings."

The idea for a movie has been put on hiatus and the project has been initiated as a theatrical touring musical. The musical began auditions in January 2010 and is called Timbiriche: El Musical (Timbiriche: The Musical). The musical play is a love story that uses Timbiriche's songs as expressions but does not tell the story of the Timbiriche band.

35th Anniversary Reunion (2017)
On 30 April 2017, Timbiriche celebrated its 35th anniversary. After several rumors and requests from fans through social networks, on 29 May 2017, Erik Rubin held a press conference where he announced the group's third reunion to commemorate its anniversary. As revealed by Rubin, this reunion started in September 2017 with an initial tour of 30 shows. The reunion tour featured the six original members of the band: Benny Ibarra, Sasha Sokol, Erik Rubin, Alix Bauer, Mariana Garza and Diego Schoening.

Members

Timeline

Discography

Studio albums

Live albums

Compilation albums

Singles

Videography

Video albums

References

External links
 Official Twitter
 Official Facebook
 Timbiriche, Nuevos ´Ålbums, Billboard en Español

 
Children's musical groups
Latin pop music groups
Mexican pop music groups
Mexican vocal groups
Musical groups from Mexico City
Musical groups established in 1982
Musical groups disestablished in 1994